The Chardara Dam, also known as Chardarin Dam, is an earth-fill embankment dam on the Syr Darya River in Shardara District, Kazakhstan. It was constructed between 1964 and 1968 with the primary purpose of irrigation. The dam has an associated 100 MW hydroelectric plant named Shardarinsk Hydroelectric Power Station. The dam provides water to the Kyzyl-Kum channel for crop irrigation. The dam has been undergoing structural rehabilitation and a power station upgrade is currently in planning. The power station's four 25 MW Kaplan turbine-generators are scheduled to be upgraded to 31.5 MW each.

See also

Farkhad Dam – upstream
List of reservoirs by surface area

References

Dams in Kazakhstan
Hydroelectric power stations in Kazakhstan
Earth-filled dams
Dams completed in 1968
Hydroelectric power stations built in the Soviet Union
1968 establishments in the Kazakh Soviet Socialist Republic
Energy infrastructure completed in 1968
Dams on the Syr Darya River